The Mokra Gora mine is one of the largest nickel mines in Serbia. The mine is located in Mokra Gora in Zlatibor District. The mine has reserves amounting to 1 billion tonnes of ore grading 0.7% nickel metal.

References 

Nickel mines in Serbia